Chengamanadu may refer to:

 Chengamanad, Ernakulam district, Kerala, India
 Chengamanadu, Kollam district, Kerala, India